The Mandara Kingdom (sometimes called Wandala) was an African kingdom in the Mandara Mountains of what is today Cameroon. The Mandara people are descended from the kingdom's inhabitants.

History 

Tradition states that Mandara was founded shortly before 1500 by a female ruler named Soukda and a non-Mandarawa hunter named Gaya. The kingdom was first referred to by Fra Mauro (in 1459) and Leo Africanus (in 1526); the provenance of its name remains uncertain.

For the kingdom's first century of history, its rulers warred with neighbouring groups in an effort to expand their territories. After conquering the Dulo (or Duolo) and establishing the capital at Dulo c. 1580, the dynasty of Sankre, a war leader, began. When the Dulo made an attempt to seize the throne, the Bornu kingdom supported the claim of Aldawa Nanda, a member of Sankre's house. Emperor Idris Alaoma of Borno personally installed Nanda as king in 1614. Bornu thus attained an influential position over Mandara.

Mai Bukar Aji, the 25th king, made Mandara a sultanate c. 1715, which it would remain for nearly two hundred years. Muslim visitors converted Bukar to Islam, and the Islamicisation of the kingdom would continue for most of the next century.

The kingdom experienced a golden age of sorts under Bukar and his successor, Bukar Guiana (1773-1828). Around 1781, the Mandara defeated the kingdom of Borno in a major battle, further expanding their control in the region. At the peak of her power at the turn of the century, Mandara received tribute from some 15 chiefdoms. However, the kingdom faced a setback in 1809, when Modibo Adama, a Fulani disciple of Usman dan Fodio, led a jihad against Mandara. Adama briefly seized Dulo, though the Mandara counterattack soon drove him from the kingdom's borders. Adama's defeat prompted Borno to ally with Mandara once again against the Fulani invaders.

Upon the death of ruler Bukai Dgjiama, Mandara's non-Muslim tributaries rose up, and the Fulani attacked once more. By 1850, Borno could not pass up the opportunity to attack the weakened kingdom. This renewed conflict began to sap the kingdom's strength, paving the way for the invasion of Muhammad Ahmad's forces in the 1880s. In 1895 or 1896, Muhammad Ahmad's army destroyed Dulo, marking a further decline in Mandara power. However, the kingdom continued to exist, repelling continual Fulani raids until it finally fell to them in 1893.

English explorer Dixon Denham accompanied a slave-raiding expedition from Borno into the Mandara kingdom in February 1823; though he barely escaped with his life following the raiders' defeat, he brought back one of the first European accounts of the kingdom. In 1902, the kingdom was conquered by Germany, passing then to France in 1918. In 1960, the Mandara kingdom became a part of newly independent Cameroon.

Rulers of Mandara 
(Dates in italics indicate de facto continuation of office)

See also 

Politics of Cameroon
Heads of government of Cameroon
Colonial heads of Cameroon British Cameroon (Cameroons)
Heads of government of British Cameroon (Cameroons)
Colonial heads of French Cameroon (Cameroun)
Heads of government of French Cameroon (Cameroun)
Fon (title)
The Fon of Batibo
Colonial heads of German Cameroon (Kamerun)
Rulers of Mandara
Rulers of the Bamum
Lists of office-holders

References
Barkindo, Bawuro Mubi (1989). The Sultanate of Mandara to 1902.  Stuttgart: Franz Steiner Verlag.
DeLancey, Mark W., and DeLancey, Mark Dike (2000). Historical Dictionary of the Republic of Cameroon. 3rd ed.
Fanso, V. G. (1989). Cameroon History for Secondary Schools and Colleges: Volume 1: Prehistoric Times to the Nineteenth Century. London: Macmillan Education Ltd.

Mandara
Cameroon history-related lists
Mandara
Countries in medieval Africa
History of Cameroon
States and territories established in the 15th century
Former monarchies of Africa
Former countries in Africa